Excello Records was an American blues independent record label, started by Ernie Young in Nashville, Tennessee, United States, in 1953 as a subsidiary of Nashboro, a gospel label.

History
It recorded such artists as Lonnie Brooks, Lightnin' Slim, Slim Harpo, Roscoe Shelton, Lazy Lester, the Kelly Brothers, Lonesome Sundown, Silas Hogan, Arthur Gunter, Marion James, Carol Fran, Warren Storm, Tabby Thomas, Guitar Gable, and a spoken word sermon by Martin Luther King Jr.

Arthur Gunter recorded an answer song to Eddy Arnold's country and western song, "I Wanna Play House With You". His song, "Baby Let's Play House", was covered by Elvis Presley.

See also
 List of record labels
 Sound Stage 7
 Dial Records
 Nashboro Records
 Stax Records
 Hi Records
 Goldwax Records
 Fame Studios

References

External links
Excello singles discography
Excello albums discography
Illustrated album discography

American record labels
Record labels established in 1953
Blues record labels